Qai Bard (also Romanized as Qā’ī Bard and Qāybard; also known as Qāẕī Badr) is a village in Shuy Rural District, in the Central District of Baneh County, Kurdistan Province, Iran. At the 2006 census, its population was 203, in 41 families. The village is populated by Kurds.

References 

Towns and villages in Baneh County
Kurdish settlements in Kurdistan Province